The Suryeo Line (水驪線, Suirei-sen) is a former narrow-gauge railway line owned by Korean National Railroad. The line connected Suwon to Yeoju.

History 
The first section of the line was opened by the privately owned Chosen Gyeongdong Railway in 1930 and in the next year the construction was complete as follows:

The line was bought on 26 October 1942 by the Chosen Railway and after the independence of Korea, it was nationalized. After the first opening of the Yeongdong Expressway, the demand diminished abruptly and the line was finally abandoned on 31 March 1972. The Everline was finally opened on 26 April 2013 and the section Giheung – Stadium–Songdam College coincides almost with the former Suryeo line. The Gyeonggang Line, which opened on August 27, 2016, will follow the line from Icheon to Yeoju.

Future plans
Neither the Ministry of Construction and Transportation nor Korail have reconstruction plans for the Suryeo Line as a whole. However, part of the line was reconstructed as a part of the Yongin Everline, and another part of the line will serve as a section of the Gyeonggang Line, allowing Yeoju to have a rail connection with Seongnam and Icheon.

Rolling stock
The Suryeo line used narrow gauge steam locomotives, narrow gauge freight cars, KNR160 diesel cars, and KNR18000 passenger cars. After closure, all rolling stock was sent to the Suin Line. Examples of KNR160 and KNR18000 cars have been preserved in the Korean Railroad Museum in Uiwang.

The Gyeonggang Line, which follows part of the Suryeo Line, uses Korail Class 371000 EMUs. The Yongin Everline, which follows another part of the Suryeo Line, uses Bombardier Innovia Metro Mark II cars.

Route

See also
Korail
Chosen Railway
Transportation in South Korea

References 

 Japanese Government Railways (1937), 鉄道停車場一覧. 昭和12年10月1日現在(The List of the Stations as of 1 October 1937), Kawaguchi Printing Company, Tokyo, p514

Railway lines in South Korea
Rail transport in South Korea
Rail transport in Korea
Chosen Railway